The Turnerkamp is a mountain in the Zillertal Alps on the border between Tyrol, Austria, and South Tyrol, Italy.

References 
 H. Klier, Walter Klier: Alpenvereinsführer Zillertaler Alpen. Rother Verlag, München 1996, 
 Alpenvereinskarte 1:25.000, Blatt 35/2, Zillertaler Alpen, mittleres Blatt
 Tabacco-Verlag, Udine, carta topografica 1:25.000, Blatt 036, Campo Tures/Sand in Taufers

External links 

Mountains of the Alps
Mountains of Tyrol (state)
Mountains of South Tyrol
Alpine three-thousanders
Zillertal Alps
Austria–Italy border
International mountains of Europe